Artistic License is an album by bassist Santi Debriano which was recorded in 2000 and released on the Savant label the following year.

Reception

In his review on AllMusic, Scott Yanow wrote, "The music is post-bop, at times quite melodic, consistently stirring and filled with surprising moments, particularly when the music builds and builds to an intense level. Well worth several listens".

Track listing 
All compositions by Santi Debriano except where noted
 "Holiday" – 6:44
 "Tenor Pan Woogie" – 5:52
 "Liberty Road" – 10:14
 "Little Free Spirit Be" – 5:23
 "Trance Dance" (Abraham Burton) – 10:40
 "Brava" – 7:54
 "Little Church" – 3:38
 "Harmonious" – 5:58
 "Leaving" – 6:48

Personnel 
Santi Debriano – bass, steel drums
Abraham Burton – tenor saxophone
Miri Ben-Ari – violin
Helio Alves – piano
Will Calhoun – drums
Willie Martinez – percussion

References 

Santi Debriano albums
2001 albums
Savant Records albums
Albums recorded at Van Gelder Studio